In enzymology, an ephedrine dehydrogenase is an enzyme that catalyzes the chemical reaction

(-)-ephedrine + NAD+  (R)-2-methylimino-1-phenylpropan-1-ol + NADH + H+

Thus, the two substrates of this enzyme are (-)-ephedrine and NAD+, whereas its 3 products are (R)-2-methylimino-1-phenylpropan-1-ol, NADH, and H+.

This enzyme belongs to the family of oxidoreductases, specifically those acting on the CH-NH group of donor with NAD+ or NADP+ as acceptor.  The systematic name of this enzyme class is (-)-ephedrine:NAD+ 2-oxidoreductase.

References

 

EC 1.5.1
NADH-dependent enzymes
Enzymes of unknown structure